Spaced is a British television sitcom created, written by and starring Simon Pegg and Jessica Stevenson, and directed by Edgar Wright, about the (comedic and sometimes farcical and action-packed) misadventures of Daisy Steiner and Tim Bisley, two twenty-something Londoners who, despite only having just met, decide to move in together after she gives up on squatting and he is kicked out by his ex-girlfriend. Supporting roles include Nick Frost as Tim's best friend Mike, Katy Carmichael as Daisy's best friend Twist, Mark Heap as lodger Brian who lives downstairs and Julia Deakin as landlady Marsha.

The first series of the show, comprising seven episodes, premiered in the UK on Channel 4 on 24 September 1999, and the second and final series, also consisting of seven episodes, started on 23 February 2001 and concluded on 13 April.

Both series were nominated for the BAFTA TV Award for Best Situation Comedy.

Plot 

Daisy Steiner and Tim Bisley are two London based twenty-somethings who meet by chance in a café while both are flat-hunting. Despite barely knowing each other, they conspire to pose as a young professional couple in order to meet the requisites of an advertisement for a relatively cheap flat in the distinctive building at 23 Meteor Street, Tufnell Park, owned by resident landlady Marsha Klein. Also in the building is Brian Topp, an eccentric conceptual artist who lives and works on his various pieces in the ground-floor flat. Frequent visitors are Daisy's best friend Twist Morgan and Tim's best friend Mike Watt. The latter ends up becoming a lodger after Marsha's daughter Amber Weary "flies the nest".

The series largely concerns the surreal and awkward adventures of Tim and Daisy as they navigate through life, come to terms with affairs of the heart, and try to figure out new and largely unproductive ways of killing time. They repeatedly clarify that they are not a couple to everyone but Marsha, but despite this, romantic tension develops between them, particularly during the second series.

Characters 

 Simon Pegg as Tim Bisley
 Jessica Stevenson as Daisy Steiner
 Nick Frost as Mike Watt
 Katy Carmichael as Twist Morgan
 Mark Heap as Brian Topp
 Julia Deakin as Marsha Klein
 Ada the Dog as Colin

Production 

The show has a distinctive cinematic style set by Wright and is shot with a single camera. In addition to borrowing liberally from the visual language of film (in particular some kind of unspecified genre films), it has particular stylistic mannerisms, such as the recurring device of scene changes occurring in the middle of a pan. The series' atmosphere is also established by the use of a particular flavour of contemporary dance music on its soundtrack.

Northern Exposure's frequent use of fantasy sequences was "one of the key influences" in the creation of the show, and Pegg and Stevenson pitched the show to LWT as "a cross between The Simpsons, The X-Files and Northern Exposure."

The series is dense with references to popular culture, including but not limited to science fiction and horror films, comic books, and video games.  The Series 2 DVD release introduced the "Homage-o-meter", an alternative set of subtitles listing every reference and homage; the "Definitive Collectors Edition" boxed set introduced a similar subtitle track for Series 1. 2000 AD artists Jim Murray and Jason Brashill provided the artwork for Tim's comic The Bear, as well as other incidental artwork for the show. Tim's boss Bilbo wears a 2000 AD comic T-shirt whilst lecturing Tim about Star Wars: Episode I – The Phantom Menace.

The series is also noted for its regular recreational drug use references, from its title onwards. Tim and Daisy smoke Cannabis on a number of occasions, one episode centring on its use. Tim and Mike take speed on one occasion, and it is implied that Tim, Mike, Daisy, Twist and Brian take ecstasy while clubbing.

Music 

Individual tracks that were particularly featured in an episode included "Is You Is or Is You Ain't My Baby?" by Louis Jordan, "Smash It" by Fuzz Townshend, and "The Staunton Lick" by Lemon Jelly. A Guy Pratt remix of the A-Team theme song, featured at the conclusion of "Epiphanies", was a fan favourite, but was never made commercially available.

In 2001, a soundtrack to the first series was released in tandem with the first series' release on DVD and videotape. A second soundtrack was not released, although the series' official fan website has an episode-by-episode list of music featured in the second series.

Episodes

Series 1 (1999)

Series 2 (2001)

Awards 

Spaced was nominated in 2000 and 2002 for a British Academy Television Award for situation comedy. Jessica Stevenson won the British Comedy Award in 1999 and 2001 for best TV Comedy Actress. Simon Pegg was nominated in 1999 for the British Comedy Award for Best Male Comedy Newcomer, and the series was nominated that same year for the British Comedy Award for Best TV Sitcom. The show's second series was nominated for an International Emmy Award in 2001 for Popular Arts.

Home releases 
Spaced Series 1 and 2 were both released on DVD in the United Kingdom. These were followed by a boxed set which collects the previously released single-series DVDs, adding a bonus disc with a feature-length documentary, Skip to the End, behind the scenes of the show, as well as a music video by Osymyso.

Music rights issues long prevented the release of Spaced in Region 1 (U.S. and Canada). Despite the raised profile resulting from Shaun of the Dead and Hot Fuzz (film collaborations between Pegg and Wright that performed well in the Region 1 countries), no DVDs surfaced between 2004 and 2007. In an interview, it was suggested a deal with Anchor Bay Entertainment failed to come to fruition over the music rights.

Wright announced the release of a Region 1 Spaced DVD release on 22 July 2008, which included an all-new commentary with Wright, Pegg, and Stevenson, as well as special guests Quentin Tarantino, Kevin Smith, Bill Hader, Diablo Cody, Matt Stone and Patton Oswalt. Supplemental features included the original commentaries, the Skip to the End documentary, outtakes, deleted scenes, and raw footage.

End of the series 
Since the show's end, cast and crew associated with Spaced have been quoted with differing opinions as to whether a third series would be produced, with their most recent statements reflecting a consensus that the show has concluded and will not see a third series.

Edgar Wright initially was "torn" about making more Spaced, saying "we have genuinely talked about it and have some neat ideas that could work in a Before Sunset/Whatever Happened to the Likely Lads? kind of way". However, in April 2007, Wright confirmed that the show no longer had any possibility of returning in any form, as the actors were all now "too old", and he and Pegg feared it would ruin a good thing. In August of that same year, Wright told Rotten Tomatoes that "there's not going to be a third season, it would be silly now" but that they could "do something that sort of like catches our heroes ten years later."

During an interview with The Guardian in July 2013 promoting The World's End with Edgar Wright and Nick Frost, Pegg stated: "Whenever we get asked about... another series of Spaced... one of the reasons we're not going to do it is because we couldn't possibly write it with any degree of truth now, because that's not where we are or who we are any more. I always find it's better to write from a perspective of truth."

American remake 

Fox announced on 29 October 2007 that it would commission a pilot for an American version of Spaced, a project they then scuttled in May 2008 following a generally negative reaction from the series' creators and fans of the original show.

Wright was initially approached about an American version after the first series was broadcast in 1999, and felt an American remake was impossible due to the series' fundamental theme. "Same reason it couldn't be a film," Wright said. "Part of the charm of 'Spaced' is, it's people in north London acting out stuff from American films... you know, Hollywood in, kind of, suburbia... American TV is much more glamorous. It doesn't make any sense. I remember that the producer at the time said, 'Yeah, we'd have to change a few things. We'd have to take out the drugs and the swearing, and obviously, Mike can't have guns.'"

Neither Wright, Pegg, nor Stevenson were at any point approached regarding the proposed American remake, which Wright had dubbed "McSpaced", due to the involvement of film director McG. Wright was upset that "they would a) never bother to get in touch but still b) splash my and Simon's names all over the trade announcements and imply that we're involved in the same way Ricky & Steve were with The Office". Pegg and Stevenson also complained of the "lack of respect" demonstrated by the creators of the proposed American series, who left them out of discussions as well.

Wright was also angry at the media for what he felt was their overlooking of Stevenson's role in the creation of Spaced by connecting the series to Shaun of the Dead and Hot Fuzz in news articles.

References 

 Episodes referenced

External links 

 
 
 
 
The Rise and Rise of the Cult Comedy Spaced
Chris Hallam on the 10th anniversary
Making-of article at Empire magazine

 
1999 British television series debuts
2001 British television series endings
1990s British sitcoms
2000s British sitcoms
British surreal comedy television series
Channel 4 sitcoms
English-language television shows
London Weekend Television shows
Nerd culture
Television series by Big Talk Productions
Television series by ITV Studios
Television shows set in London